Ryecroft Hall is a Grade II listed building in Audenshaw, Tameside, Greater Manchester. Originally a home to several prominent local residents, the hall was ultimately donated to the people of Audenshaw by Austin Hopkinson in 1922 and still serves the local community to the present day.

History 
The land that Ryecroft Hall sits on was once owned by the Earl of Stamford and Warrington and was sold to prominent mill owner James Smith Buckley. Upon his death in 1885 the house was passed to his nephew Abel Buckley the same year he became MP for Prestwich living there until his death in 1908. Ryecroft Hall would ultimately be sold to Austin Hopkinson in 1913.

During the first world war the hall was used as a voluntary hospital with over 100 beds, fitting in with his generous nature he donated the hall to the people of Audenshaw in 1920.

Present Day 
Audenshaw council would ultimately be subsumed by Tameside Council and they currently own the hall which is used by the local community to this very day, as a testament to its history there are two blue plaques on the side of the building. One is of Austin Hopkinson who donated the hall and the other is of Harry Norton Schofield who was awarded the Victoria Cross in the Boer War.

References

Grade II listed buildings in the Metropolitan Borough of Tameside
Audenshaw